Almé Z (16 April 1966 – 21 March 1991) was a 16.1 hh (165 cm) sport horse stallion who was a prolific sire of show jumping horses.

His sire was by the Selle Français, Ibrahim, a stallion whose influence is still incredibly strong today. His dam, Girondine, produced three full brothers to Almé, which were all licensed stallions or successful jumpers.

The young stallion was ridden by Bernard Geneste as a five-year-old, before he was purchased and competed by American Fred Lorimer Graham for two years. He was then taken as a mount by François Mathy and Johan Heins, with whom he competed internationally. He won many Grand Prix  events, including the Grand Prix of the Netherlands.

Breeding career
Almé had a successful career at stud, which is often compared to that of the champion Thoroughbred stallion, Northern Dancer. He first stood at stud as a five year old, serving France from 1971–1974, before standing at Zangersheide from 1975–1985. He was then returned to France, where he stood at the Brullemail stud farm until his retirement in 1990, covering 420 mares from across Europe. His stud fee during this time, after having proven himself so well, ranged from F14,000 to F20,000.

During his first 4 years in France, Almé sired the international show jumpers Galoubet, I Love You (2 time World Cup winner), and Jalisco. Jalisco B is the father of super star stallion Quidam de Revel, Galoubet A is the father of Quick Star and of the three times World Cup winner Baloubet du Rouet. While standing at Zangersheide, his offspring were registered in the Hanoverian stud book, where his blood had great influence, and he also made his way into the Holstein stud books through his sons Ahorn Z, Aloubé Z, Athlet Z, and Alexis Z. His grandson, Quidam de Revel, has also been used in Holstein breeding.

Alme is the only horse to have sired 2 World Champions and 3 Olympic horses. His son, Aerobic, became the top priced horse at the PSI Auktion in Ankum (650,000 DM).

Almé's one fault, however, is his progeny's predisposition to scrotal hernia, and several sons and grandsons needed a testicle removed. The stallion had an operation himself due to a hernia, and became a monorchid in 1984.

Almé's Statistics from the 2002 FEI World Equestrian Games in Jerez
 92 Total horses participated at the WEG: 32 uncastrated males, 31 geldings, 29 mares
 5 stallions had more than one horse participating:
Quidam de Revel (5)
Capitol I (4)
Le Tot de Semilly (3)
Robin IZ (2)
Touchdown (2)

Quidam de Revel, Robin I Z, and Touchdown are all grandsons of Almé.  Almé had a total of 21 horses (22.3%) in the WEG competition descended from him. At the end of the speed class and Nations Cup, 9 (36%) of the Top 25 horses were descended from Almé.  After two rounds of the Individual Championship, 4 (40%) of the Top 10 were descended from Almé.  Of the four horses in the final round, 3 (75%) were descended from Almé.

In 2002 his great grand daughter Liscalgot won World Championship individual gold for Dermott Lennon of Ireland. She is a mare by Touchdown who was by Galoubet A.

Notable Sons of Almé
 Ahorn Z
 Aladin Z
 Alexis Z
 Aloubé Z
 Animo*
 Athlet Z 
 Aerobic
 Artos Z
 Galoubet A
 Ilmeo 
 I Love You - 1983 World Cup Final Winner
 Jalisco B 
 Jalme des Musnuls  
 Vico

References

External links
 Almé's pedigree &  photos

French show jumping horses
Sport horse sires
1966 animal births
1991 animal deaths
Individual male horses
Individual Selle Français horses